Lalit may refer to:
 Lalit party, a left political party in Mauritius
 Lalit (raga), a raga in Indian classical music
 Lalit Suri, an Indian politician
 Lalit Surajmal Kanodia, an Indian business entrepreneur

See also
 Jatin–Lalit, a Bollywood film composer duo
 Rag Lalit, 1989 album by Ram Narayan
 Lalith, a name
 Lalita (disambiguation)